Pat Bonnett (born September 11, 1951) is a former Grey Cup champion offensive lineman and defensive end who played seven seasons for the Montreal Alouettes of the Canadian Football League, winning two Grey Cup Championships.

External links
CFLAPEDIA BIO
FANBASE BIO

1951 births
Canadian football offensive linemen
Idaho State Bengals football players
Living people
Montreal Alouettes players
Players of Canadian football from Quebec
Canadian football people from Montreal